The National Space Science Agency (NSSA) (Arabic: الهيئة الوطنية لعلوم الفضاء) is the Bahraini government entity responsible for space science program. It was established by Royal Decree No. 11 for the Year 2014 and works under the supervision of the Supreme Defense Council.

Activities 
NSSA's current focus is on promoting space science, technology and applications in the Kingdom of Bahrain through many community events; building capacity in the fields of satellite manufacturing, satellite tracking, control and monitoring, earth observation data and image processing and analysis to fulfil stakeholders' national needs; and creating a new “space” sector in the Kingdom.

The NSSA offers 3 services: providing high resolution images for the Kingdom of Bahrain in different sizes and formats; processing and analyzing satellite imagery and data to generate useful information to fulfil stakeholders needs; and providing Satellite Images and Data for the Kingdom of Bahrain in different resolutions, bands and selected time.

The NSSA have signed many memorandum of understanding with regional and international space agencies such as between NSSA and the Russian state space corporation Roscosmos,the United Arab Emirates Space Agency (UAESA), Italian Space Agency (ASI), Indian Space Research Organisation (ISRO), Mohammed bin Rashid Space Centre (MBRSC) and UK Space Agency (UKSA).

References

External links
 NSSA home page
 Official NSSA Twitter page
 Official NSSA Instagram page
 Official NSSA Youtube page

Space agencies
Space programs by country
Government agencies of Bahrain